Samuel Lucas (1811–1865) was abolitionist and newspaper editor.

Samuel Lucas may also refer to:

Samuel Lucas (1805–1870), British amateur painter and brewer
Sam Lucas (1848–1916), American actor

Other
Samuel Lucas JMI School- Junior school in Hitchin, Hertfordshire, named after Samuel Lucas (1805–1870)